Aurelio Molina (born August 6, 1978) is a Mexican former professional Association football player.

External links

Profile at BDFA

1978 births
Living people
Mexican footballers
Association football defenders
Tigres UANL footballers
Club Tijuana footballers
Dorados de Sinaloa footballers
C.D. Veracruz footballers